Get Yer Boots On: The Best of Slade is a compilation album by the British rock band Slade, released in America only by Shout! Factory in March 2004. It was the first Slade compilation to be released in America since 1973's Sladest and was followed by the Shout! Factory compilation In for a Penny: Raves & Faves in 2007. The compilation features sixteen tracks, covering the band's commercial heyday from 1971–75, and their American commercial breakthrough in 1984 with "Run Runaway" and "My Oh My".

Track listing

Critical reception

Stephen Thomas Erlewine of AllMusic commented: "A terrific rock & roll record, full of big, dumb riffs, anthemic singalong choruses, and songs that are impossible to get out of your head. Because Slade's music was so deliberately dumb, they tend to be either forgotten or dismissed, but Get Yer Boots On proves they made some of the most addictive, tuneful hard rock of the '70s - it's blue-collar glitter, as primal as AC/DC and catchy as bubblegum pop. Anybody who loves loud guitars and humongous hooks will find this irresistible, and this long-overdue U.S. compilation is the best place to discover how great this band really was."

Personnel
Slade
Noddy Holder – lead vocals, rhythm guitar
Dave Hill – lead guitar, backing vocals
Jim Lea – bass, piano, violin, keyboards, backing vocals
Don Powell – drums

Additional personnel
Chas Chandler - producer (tracks 1-14)
John Punter - producer (tracks 15-16)
Shawn Amos - A&R direction
John Roberts - artwork, package supervision
Dan Epstein - compilation producer, liner notes
Bryan Lasley, David Gorman - package design for HackMart
Julee Stover, Tina Reynolds - project assistance
Dezo Hoffmann, Gered Mankowitz, MichaelOchsArchives.com - photography

References

2004 greatest hits albums
Slade compilation albums
Shout! Factory compilation albums